The Very Best of Michael Nyman: Film Music 1980–2001 is a compilation album film music by Michael Nyman. It was released on November 6, 2001 by Virgin Records. It including three previously unreleased tracks (from Nelly's Version and Monsieur Hire) and one from the limited release, La Traversée de Paris.  Some tracks are from the original soundtracks, while others are from pre-existing rerecordings such as The Essential Michael Nyman Band and Live.

Track listing

Disc 1
Bird List (04:16) from The Falls/Live
Chasing Sheep Is Best Left to Shepherds (05:26) from The Draughtsman's Contract/The Essential Michael Nyman Band
An Eye for Optical Theory (05:09) from The Draughtsman's Contract/soundtrack
Homage to Maurice (02:16) from Nelly's Version (previously unreleased)
Angelfish Decay (02:49) from A Zed and Two Noughts/soundtrack
Time Lapse (03:58) from A Zed and Two Noughts/The Essential Michael Nyman Band
Trysting Fields (03:27) from Drowning by Numbers/soundtrack
Wheelbarrow Walk (02:12) from Drowning by Numbers/The Essential Michael Nyman Band
Knowing the Ropes (03:17) from Drowning by Numbers/The Essential Michael Nyman Band
Memorial (12:00) from The Cook, The Thief, His Wife & Her Lover/The Essential Michael Nyman Band
Skating (01:26) from Monsieur Hire (previously unreleased)
Peeking (02:43) from Monsieur Hire (previously unreleased)
Abandoning (03:30) from Le Mari de la Coiffeuse
Skirting (02:05) from Le Mari de la Coiffeuse
Miranda Previsited (06:48) from Prospero's Books/La Traversée de Paris
Here to There (01:00) from The Piano
The Heart Asks Pleasure First/The Promise (03:10) from The Piano
All Imperfect Things (04:02) from The Piano
Dreams of a Journey (05:03) from The Piano

Disc 2
Escape (03:38) from À la folie
Fly Drive (01:32) from Carrington
The Infinite Complexities Of Christmas (04:12) from Carrington
If (04:25) from The Diary of Anne Frank
Abel Carries Ephraim (05:55) from The Ogre
Becoming Jerome/God's Hands (02:58) from Gattaca
The Morrow (03:11) from Gattaca
The Other Side (03:41) from Gattaca
The Departure (03:49) from Gattaca
Convening the Coven (04:05) from Practical Magic
Stranger at the Window (01:38) from Ravenous
Cannibal Fantasy (02:12) from Ravenous
Molly (02:51) from Wonderland
Eddie (03:56) from Wonderland
Dan (02:15) from Wonderland
Eileen (03:41) from Wonderland
Sarah Dies (02:58) from The End Of The Affair
The End of the Affair (02:56) from The End Of The Affair
The Shootout (05:06) from The Claim
The Burning (09:18) from The Claim

2001 compilation albums
Michael Nyman albums
Michael Nyman Film Music
Virgin Records compilation albums